Gamel Hexadecagon Barn is a historic barn located at North Collins in Erie County, New York. It is a two-story frame structure and covered with board and batten siding.

It was listed on the National Register of Historic Places in 1984.

It has a hay hood.

References

Barns on the National Register of Historic Places in New York (state)
Barns with hay hoods
Infrastructure completed in 1900
Buildings and structures in Erie County, New York
National Register of Historic Places in Erie County, New York